The Band Wagon is a 1953 American musical romantic comedy film directed by Vincente Minnelli, starring Fred Astaire and Cyd Charisse. It tells the story of an aging musical star who hopes a Broadway show will restart his career. However, the play's director wants to make it a pretentious retelling of the  Faust legend and brings in a prima ballerina who clashes with the star. Along with Singin' in the Rain (1952), it is regarded as one of the finest Metro-Goldwyn-Mayer musicals, although it was a modest box-office success on first release.

The songs were written by the team of composer Arthur Schwartz and lyricist Howard Dietz. Schwartz was a prolific Hollywood composer who teamed with numerous lyricists over the years, while Dietz, a studio publicist, generally collaborated with Schwartz. Some of the songs in the film had been created for the original 1931 Broadway musical by Schwartz and Dietz, also titled The Band Wagon, with a book by George S. Kaufman and starring Fred Astaire and his sister Adele. The movie's dances and musical numbers were staged by Michael Kidd.

The song "That's Entertainment!", which Schwartz and Dietz wrote specifically for the film, was a hit and has become a standard in popular music. Another song orchestrated by Conrad Salinger, "Dancing in the Dark", is considered part of the Great American Songbook and was from the original Broadway production. Astaire's early number in the film, "A Shine on Your Shoes", was written for a 1932 Broadway revue with music and lyrics by Dietz and Schwartz titled Flying Colors. (It was originally performed by the dancing team of Buddy and Vilma Ebsen). In the film version of The Band Wagon, the song was reworked as a specialty number by jazz arranger Skip Martin to showcase all of Astaire's musical talents.

The musical director was Adolph Deutsch and the production was designed by Oliver Smith working for the first time in motion pictures. The film was nominated for Academy Awards for Best Costume Design, Color, Best Music, Scoring of a Musical Picture and Best Writing, Story and Screenplay.

Screenwriters Betty Comden and Adolph Green, who received the nomination for the screenplay, patterned the film's characters Lester and Lily Marton after themselves; however, the fictional characters were a married couple, and Comden and Green were not romantically involved. The character of an overachieving impresario was developed with the successful producer-director-actor José Ferrer in mind.

In 1995, The Band Wagon was selected for preservation in the United States National Film Registry by the Library of Congress as being "culturally, historically, or aesthetically significant". In 2006, this film ranked number 17 on the American Film Institute's list of best musicals.

Plot
Tony Hunter, once a famous star of musical comedies on stage and later on screen, is largely forgotten after three years without appearing in a film. He returns from Hollywood to New York. At Grand Central Station, he is recognized but almost ignored by reporters who are there by chance as Ava Gardner is on the same train. However, he is greeted enthusiastically by his good friends Lester and Lily Marton, and they tell him they have written a stage show, a light musical comedy, that will be a perfect comeback for Tony. They will also act in it, and they already have caught the interest of Jeffrey Cordova, who they say can do anything: Currently he is starring in, as well as directing, a new adaptation of Oedipus Rex that he wrote based on the original Greek story.

As soon as Jeffrey hears Lily outline the play, he declares it to be a brilliant reinterpretation of the Faust legend, which should star Tony and himself as the characters corresponding to Faust and the Devil. The Martons are delighted that he will be acting as well as directing, but Tony is dubious about the Faust idea. Jeffrey declares that the boundaries between genres in the theater are artificial, and "Bill Shakespeare" and Bill Robinson are all parts of the same whole—to prove his point, he leads the four in singing "That's Entertainment!" Tony agrees, and Jeffrey has the Martons rewrite the play as a dark, pretentious musical drama (when Lester also becomes dubious, Lily insists that one person must be in charge and Jeffrey can succeed at anything).

Jeffrey does succeed in arranging for the beautiful and talented ballerina Gabrielle "Gaby" Gerard to join the production, along with Paul Byrd, who is her boyfriend, choreographer, and manager—even though he always insisted that a musical play would be beneath her. When Tony and Gaby meet, they become sarcastic and hostile to each other, but this is actually because they are insecure: Each of them feels much less talented than the other.

Eventually, it all proves too much for Tony, and he walks out. Gaby follows to meet him privately. In his hotel room, she comments that the paintings by famous artists on the wall are better reproductions than usual in a hotel; he says they are his own property, and are originals. She recognizes a painting of ballerinas as an early Degas. Tony and Gaby put their troubles aside, go for a horse-drawn carriage ride, dance together, and realize they can work together after all. They also begin to fall in love.

When the first out-of-town tryout in New Haven proves disastrous, Tony demands that Jeffrey convert the production back into the light comedy that the Martons had envisioned. Jeffrey says that while they will have to find new backers because the original ones have walked out, he will be happy to appear in that show—if Tony is in charge of it. Tony accepts, using his art collection to finance the production.  Paul says the show is no longer suitable for Gaby and walks out, expecting her to follow, but she is pleased to stay and work with Tony.

After some weeks on tour to perfect the new lighthearted musical numbers, the revised show proves to be a hit on its Broadway opening. Afterwards, Gaby and Tony kiss in front of the entire cast and crew, and the finale is a reprise of "That's Entertainment!"

Cast

 Fred Astaire as Tony Hunter
 Cyd Charisse as Gabrielle Gerard
 Oscar Levant as Lester Marton
 Nanette Fabray as Lily Marton
 Jack Buchanan as Jeffrey Cordova
 James Mitchell as Paul Byrd
 Robert Gist as Hal Benton

Uncredited
 India Adams as the singing voice of Cyd Charisse
 Ava Gardner as herself (cameo)
 Thurston Hall as Colonel Tripp
 Douglas Fowley as auctioneer
 Madge Blake as investor
 Judy Landon as dancer in troupe
 Bobby Watson as Bobby
 Sue Casey as tall girl in arcade
 Leroy Daniels as shoeshine man in arcade in "Shine on Your Shoes" 
 Henry Corden as orchestra leader
 Julie Newmar as model / chorine in "Girl Hunt Ballet"
 Fred Aldrich as hot dog vendor
 Richard Alexander as stagehand
 Jimmy Thompson as Jimmy
 Roy Engel as reporter
 Emory Parnell as man on train
 Herb Vigran as man on train
 Dee Turnell as Barbara
 Dee Hartford as model in "Girl Hunt Ballet"

Musical numbers

Source:

 "By Myself" – Tony (introduced in the stage musical Between the Devil)
 "Shine on Your Shoes" – Tony and a shoeshine man (Leroy Daniels; the song was first introduced in the stage musical Flying Colors)
 "That's Entertainment!" – Jeffrey, with Tony, Lester and Lily
 "The Beggars Waltz" – danced by Gabrielle, James Mitchell, and corps de ballet
 "High and Low" – Chorus
 "Dancing in the Dark" – danced by Tony and Gabrielle
 "You and the Night and the Music" – Chorus, danced by Tony and Gabrielle
 "Something to Remember You By" – Chorus
 "I Love Louisa" – Tony, Lester, and Lily
 "New Sun in the Sky" – Gabrielle
 "I Guess I'll Have to Change My Plan" – Tony and Jeffrey
 "Louisiana Hayride" – Lily and Chorus (the song was first introduced in the stage musical Flying Colors)
 "Triplets" – Tony, Jeffrey, and Lily (the performers dance on their knees, costumed in baby attire; the song was first introduced in the stage musical Between the Devil)
 "The Girl Hunt Ballet" (inspired by the novels of Mickey Spillane) – danced by Tony and Gabrielle
 "That's Entertainment!" (reprise/finale) – Lester, Gabrielle, Jeffrey, Tony and Lily

One musical number shot for the film, but dropped from the final release, was a seductive dance routine featuring Charisse performing "Two-Faced Woman". As with the other Charisse songs, her singing was dubbed by India Adams. Adams' recording of the song was reused for Torch Song (1953) for a musical number featuring Joan Crawford. The retrospective That's Entertainment! III (1994) released the Charisse version to the public for the first time. This footage was included with the 2005 DVD release of The Band Wagon.

Reception
In seven weeks at Radio City Music Hall in New York City, the film grossed $1,044,000, one of the higher grossing films at the theater. According to MGM records, the film earned them distributor rentals of $2.3 million in the U.S. and Canada and $1,202,000 in other countries, resulting in a loss of $1,185,000.

Stage adaptation

A musical stage adaptation, titled Dancing in the Dark, ran at the Old Globe Theatre in San Diego from March 4 to April 20, 2008, with plans to bring the show to Broadway. Gary Griffin directed, with a book by Douglas Carter Beane and choreography by Warren Carlyle. The cast included Patrick Page as the "deliciously pretentious" director-actor-producer Jeffrey Cordova, Mara Davi playing Gabrielle Gerard, and Scott Bakula as "song-and-dance man" Tony Hunter.

In the Variety review of the musical, Bob Verini wrote: "There's no reason this reconstituted Band Wagon can't soar once it jettisons its extraneous and self-contradictory elements."

A revised version of the stage adaptation under the name The Band Wagon was presented in a staged concert in November 2014 as part of a New York City Center Encores! special event. The cast starred Brian Stokes Mitchell, Tracey Ullman, Michael McKean, Tony Sheldon, and Laura Osnes, with direction and choreography by Kathleen Marshall.

Impact

In Michael Jackson's music videos for "Smooth Criminal" (1988) and "You Rock My World" (2001), he pays tribute to The Band Wagon with a similar dance and bar fight sequence performed in a 1920–1930s style lounge. Dancers perform similar moves and wear comparable period clothing in Jackson's videos. In "Smooth Criminal", Jackson wears a white suit with a blue-collared shirt and a white hat with a black stripe on it, replicating Astaire's outfit from "The Girl Hunt Ballet", The Band Wagon finale. For "You Rock My World", he imitates Astaire's choreography. Jackson's "Billie Jean" music video features similar elements as those of the "Girl Hunt Ballet": The storefront scenery through which the paparazzo conducts his manhunt and the animal print cloth he finds for a clue are two allusions to the original work. Using the line "she came at me in sections" for the titular song of his album Dangerous, Jackson notably pays homage to the film on at least three successive albums.

Steve Martin and Gilda Radner performed a serio-comic parody homage to the "Dancing in the Dark" dance segment on an episode of Saturday Night Live, originally broadcast on April 22, 1978.

References

Bibliography

External links
 
 
 
 
 
 Howard Dietz and Arthur Schwartz at Masterworks Broadway
 Newsweek discussion transcript about The Band Wagon
  (1931 stage musical)

1953 films
1953 musical comedy films
1953 romantic comedy films
1950s American films
1950s English-language films
1950s romantic musical films
American musical comedy films
American romantic comedy films
American romantic musical films
Films about musical theatre
Films directed by Vincente Minnelli
Films produced by Arthur Freed
Films scored by Adolph Deutsch
Films set in New York City
Films with screenplays by Betty Comden and Adolph Green
Metro-Goldwyn-Mayer films
Musicals by Arthur Schwartz
United States National Film Registry films